is a Japanese voice actress.

Filmography

Anime

Films

Video games

Drama CDs

References

External links
  
 

1981 births
Voice actresses from Okinawa Prefecture
Japanese voice actresses
Living people